Tin Liu Ha is a village in Lam Tsuen, Tai Po District, Hong Kong.

Administration
Tin Liu Ha is a recognized village under the New Territories Small House Policy.

History
At the time of the 1911 census, the population of Tin Liu Ha was 177. The number of males was 74.

See also
 Ko Tin Hom, a nearby village

References

External links

 Delineation of area of existing village Tin Liu Ha (Tai Po) for election of resident representative (2019 to 2022)
 Antiquities Advisory Board. Historic Building Appraisal. Nos. 24B-24D Ha Tin Liu Ha Pictures
 Antiquities Advisory Board. Historic Building Appraisal. Nos. 32-33 Ha Tin Liu Ha Pictures
 Antiquities Advisory Board. Historic Building Appraisal. Chung Man Tsoi Ancestral Hall, Ha Tin Liu Ha Pictures
 Antiquities Advisory Board. Historic Building Appraisal. Chung Ancestral Hall, No. 34 Ha Tin Liu Ha Pictures

Villages in Tai Po District, Hong Kong
Lam Tsuen